Hepatocystis epomophori is a species of parasitic protozoa. They are transmitted by flies of the genus Culicoides and infect mammals.

Taxonomy

This species was described in 1926 by Rhodhain.

Description

This species is similar to Hepatocystis brosseti and Hepatocystis carpenteri.

Distribution

This species is found in the Congo Basin.

Hosts

This species infects the fruit bat (Epomorphorus gambianus).

References

Parasites of Diptera
Parasites of bats
Haemosporida